Michael Connell (born July 2, 1975) is an American professional golfer. 

Connell turned professional in 1998 and spent many years playing on a variety of mini-tours. In 2002 he was player of the year on the NGA Hooters Tour. Connell finally earned his PGA Tour card for 2006 through qualifying school, but lost it at the end of that season. He returned to the Tour via the qualifying school once more in 2009, and enjoyed more success in 2010, finishing 115th in the money list to retain his playing status.

Professional wins (3)
2002 Eagle Bluff, Club @ North Creek (both NGA Hooters Tour)
2007 Savannah Lakes Resort Classic (NGA Hooters Tour)

See also
2005 PGA Tour Qualifying School graduates
2009 PGA Tour Qualifying School graduates

References

External links

American male golfers
Mississippi State Bulldogs golfers
PGA Tour golfers
Golfers from Dallas
University of Texas at San Antonio alumni
1975 births
Living people